Isa Danieli (born 13 March 1937) is an Italian film actress. She has appeared in 32 films since 1962.

Selected filmography
 Love and Anarchy (1973)
 The Peaceful Age (1974)
 Swept Away (1974)
 Il marsigliese (1975) by Giacomo Battiato
 Caro Michele (1976)
 Blood Feud (1978)
 Così parlò Bellavista (1984)
 Macaroni (1985)
 Camorra (A Story of Streets, Women and Crime) (1986)
 Cinema Paradiso (1988)
 Journey of Hope (1990)

External links

1937 births
Living people
Italian film actresses
Actresses from Naples
Nastro d'Argento winners
20th-century Italian actresses